Harrison Brown (1917–1986) was an American scientist.

Harrison Brown may also refer to:
Harrison Browne (born 1993), Canadian transgender ice hockey player
Harrison Bird Brown (1831–1915), American painter

See also
Harry Brown (disambiguation)